Al-Hajib (also spelled Al-Hajeb) is a town in the Aleppo Governorate in northern Syria, south of as-Safira. Nearby localities include Khanasser to the south.  Al-Hajeb had a population of 10,408 in 2004.

References

Populated places in al-Safira District